

In computing, convert is a command-line utility included in the Windows NT operating system line.  It is used to convert volumes using the FAT file systems to NTFS.

Overview
convert is an external command first introduced with Windows 2000. If the drive cannot be locked (for example, the drive is the system volume or the current drive) the command gives the option to convert the drive the next time the computer is restarted.

On Unix-like systems, there are similar tools like convertfs, a utility which performs in-place conversion between any two file systems with sparse file support and btrfs-convert, a tool that can convert from ext2/ext3/ext4 or reiserFS file system to Btrfs in-place.

Syntax
The command-syntax is:

 convert volume /FS:NTFS [/V]

Example
The following command converts the volume on drive D: to NTFS. The /v command-line option will cause it to display all messages during the conversion process.

C:\>convert d: /fs:ntfs /v

References

Further reading

External links

Microsoft TechNet Convert article

Hard disk software